Yoo Dong-Min (Hanja: 柳東玟; born 27 March 1989) is a South Korean footballer who currently plays for Gyeongju KHNP.

Club career
Yoo was selected in the priority pick of the 2011 K-League Draft by Gwangju FC.

References

External links 

1989 births
Living people
South Korean footballers
Gwangju FC players
K League 1 players
Korea National League players
Association football forwards